The Cigher is a left tributary of the river Crișul Alb in Romania. It discharges into the Crișul Alb in Sintea Mică, near Zărand. The Tauț dam is located on the Cigher.

Tributaries

The following rivers are tributaries to the river Cigher:

Left: Chilodia, Pustaciu, Nadăș, Timercea, Dudița, Valea Mare, Sodom
Right: Minișel, Miniș

References

Rivers of Romania
Rivers of Arad County